The 1832 United States presidential election in New Jersey took place between November 2 and December 5, 1832, as part of the 1832 United States presidential election. Voters chose eight representatives, or electors to the Electoral College, who voted for President and Vice President.

New Jersey voted for the Democratic Party candidate, Andrew Jackson, over the National Republican candidate, Henry Clay, and the Anti-Masonic Party candidate, William Wirt. Jackson won New Jersey by a margin of 0.76%.

Results

See also
 United States presidential elections in New Jersey

References

New Jersey
1832
1832 New Jersey elections